The 1971 IHF Olympic Asian qualification tournament was held in Japan. The winner of the tournament qualified for the 1972 Summer Olympics.

Standings

Matches
All times are local (UTC+9).

Broadcast 
The first and last game of Japan were broadcast by NHK Educational TV. For the game on 23 November Israel against Japan there were negotiation for a radio broadcast at NHK Radio 1.

References

External links
Todor66

Qualification tournament - Asia
Olympics tournaments
November 1971 sports events in Asia
IHF